Centropyge flavipectoralis, known commonly as the yellowfin angelfish or moonbeam angelfish, is a marine ray-finned fish, a marine angelfish belonging to the family Pomacanthidae. It is native to the Indian Ocean.

Description
Centropyge flavipectoralis is largely brown in colour marked on the flanks with metallic blue stripes. The pectoral fin is yellow. The dorsal fin contains 14–15 spines and 14–15 soft rays while the anal fin has three spines and 16–18 soft rays.

Distribution
Centropyge flavipectoralis is found in the Indian Ocean in the Maldives, Sri Lanka and the Andaman Sea from Thailand south to northern Sumatra.

Habitat and biology
This species occurs in areas of rubble with limited growth of coral. It is usually encountered in small groups on seabeds with some cover. Its diet is mainly algae, worms and crustaceans.

Systematics
Centropyge flavipectoralis was  first formally described in 1977 by the American ichthyologist John Ernest Randall (1924-2020) and his German colleague Wolfgang Klausewitz (1922-2018) with the type locality given as Lively Rock at Trincomalee in Sri Lanka. The specific name flavipectoralis means “yellow pectoral” referring to the colour of the pectoral fins. Within the genus Centropyge this species is considered, by some authorities, to be in the subgenus Centropyge.

Utilisation
Centropyge flavipectoralis is infrequent in the aquarium trade. It is reputed to be a hardy species in captivity but its relative drabness reduces demand.

References

flavipectoralis
Fish of Thailand
Fauna of the Maldives
Fish of Sri Lanka
Fish of the Indian Ocean
Taxa named by John Ernest Randall
Taxa named by Wolfgang Klausewitz
Fish described in 1977